John Leslie Bennett  (born 25 October 1948) is an Australian educator. He is Conjoint Professor of Education at the University of New South Wales. Bennett was Chief Executive of the Office of the Board of Studies (OBOS) from 2002 to 2009.

Bennett began his career as a teacher of mathematics at Maitland Boys' High School in 1968. He was appointed as Head of Mathematics at Dover Heights Girls' High School in 1978. From 1986 Bennett held a variety of positions in assessment and information services with OBOS and its precursor. He was appointed General Manager (Chief Executive) in December 2002.

During his term as Chief Executive, Bennett oversaw the implementation of significant changes to the Higher School Certificate, including standards-referenced assessment and reporting, onscreen marking of examinations, a mandatory course in academic integrity and the release of HSC results by SMS.

In 2009 Bennett was awarded the Wyndham Medal by the Australian College of Educators for his leadership and intellectual contribution.

In 2021, Bennett was made a Member of the Order of Australia.

Publications

References

1948 births
Living people
Australian schoolteachers
Australian public servants
Academic staff of the University of New South Wales
21st-century Australian educators
20th-century Australian educators
Members of the Order of Australia